Dan Kgomosotho is a South African Anglican bishop: he has been the Bishop of Mpumalanga since 2010.

Notes

21st-century Anglican Church of Southern Africa bishops
Anglican bishops of Mpumalanga
Living people
Year of birth missing (living people)